Finet may refer to:

People
Achille Eugène Finet (1863–1913), French botanist
John Finet (1571–1641), English Master of Ceremonies
Louis Finet (born 1894), Belgian Olympic vaulter
Patrice Pellat-Finet (born 1952), French Olympic alpine skier
Paul Finet (1897–1965), Belgian politician
Finet Authority (1958–1959), European Coal and Steel Community

Other
FINET, a secure private network used by Malaysia's Ringgit Operations Monitoring System